Esteri Tebandeke (born 16 May 1984) is a Ugandan filmmaker, actress, dancer and visual artist. She is a graduate of the Margaret Trowell School of Industrial and Fine Art at Makerere University.

She has played roles in the films Sins of the Parents (2008), Master on Duty (2009), Queen of Katwe (2016) and Her Broken Shadow (2016) was her first foray into science fiction.

Early life and education 
Esteri was born in Kampala, Uganda, and is of Teso descent. She is the sixth of eight children and her family has been living in Uganda. Esteri attended St. Joseph's Girl's Secondary School in Uganda and acted in school plays and dance performances.

Career

Dance 
Esteri starting working as a contemporary dancer in 2008 and has performed with various dance companies in Uganda namely Keiga Dance Company, Stepping Stones dance company, Mutumizi dance Company, Guerrilla Dance Company among others.

She has staged performances at various arts platforms namely; Dance Week Uganda, Dance Transmissions Festival (both annual contemporary dance showcases), Bayimba International Festival of the Arts and Umoja International Festival– initially as a student and a teacher for 3 years– to mention a few. Her work is not only restricted to Uganda but she has also been involved in projects in Kenya, Rwanda, Madagascar, South Africa, Tanzania, the United States of America, and Ethiopia. She has performed at La Mama in New York in 2012, Artwater Village Theatre in 2013 and New Orleans Fringe in 2014.

Theatre 
She has been an actress since 2008 performing in a variety of theatre and film productions in Uganda. Her debut theatre production, Lion and The Jewel where she portrayed Sidi was directed by Kaya Kagimu Mukasa. Other theatre projects have included Maria Kizito– lead actress as a psychopathic nun– a play by Brown University professor, Erik Ehn about the trial of nuns who facilitated the massacre of Tutsis during the Rwandan genocide. She was the lead actress in Cooking Oil, a play by award-winning playwright Deborah Asiimwe, which was performed in Uganda and the United States of America. Other theatre projects have included a mentally disturbed psychiatrist in the Ugandan production of The Body of a Woman as a Battlefield in the Bosnian War as well as a frustrated wife in The Marriage Chronicles. In late 2015, Esteri travelled to the Northern part of Uganda with a group of artists to collect stories and hopefully turn these into stage plays that will be presented to audiences around the world. The Story Circle project, which was headed by Jerry Stropnicky, a theatre practitioner in the United States gave her great insights into the use of story as a mechanism to help people cope with different aspects of life such as trauma.

She has also ventured into directing and worked on a theatre project, Afroman Spice from Afroman ensemble, an all female theatre ensemble. The project premiered in Kampala in June 2015 and has since been staged at The Market for African Performing Arts (MASA) in Ivory Coast and is booked to show in Rwanda, Tunisia and Niger in 2016.

As a teacher she has facilitated training sessions with other arts projects and her desire to gain more life experience and share what she knows with others in a professional environment drives her to work with people from all walks of life. Her experience has also involved instruction of children in different schools around the city of Kampala.

Film 
Esteri got her first acting role in a short film on one of the programs of the Maisha Film Lab program– a Uganda-based non-profit film training initiative founded by award-winning director Mira Nair for emerging East African and South Asian filmmakers. She acted in Judith Adong's Sins of the Parents in 2008 and Master on Duty in 2009 by Joseph Ken Ssebaggala. Her latest film work was on the soon to be released Walt Disney Pictures production, Queen of Katwe, starring Academy Award-winning actress Lupita Nyong’o and David Oyelowo. Speaking about the film, Esteri describes the impact that Queen of Katwe has had on her in the following words:"Before the film, I was afraid of my dreams because they were so big. But now I am even more scared—they are bigger." Mira Nair, one of her greatest inspirations in the film industry in a recent article describes her as "a luminous person." Quoting Mira Nair's famous maxim:"If we don't tell our own stories, no one else will."To that end, she is committed to developing stories from her home country, Uganda and the African continent which address themes of local significance but with international appeal. She is exploring the possibilities of developing Ugandan content in collaboration with various creatives in East Africa and beyond.

Esteri has had her films as an actress and director shown at numerous festivals like Toronto International film festival, BFI London Film Festival, Luxor African Film Festival, Raindance Film Festival, Uganda Film Festival, Durban International Film Festival, Africa International Film Festival.

Esteri was part of the writing team on a web series being developed in collaboration with film students from Uganda, Kenya, Ghana and Germany. This project was shot on location in Accra, Ghana and is currently in post-production. Little Black Dress, her directorial debut is a short film that was shot on location in Nairobi, Kenya in April 2019. The film premiered in competition at the 2019 edition of the Africa International Film Festival in Lagos, Nigeria and in competition at the Luxor African Film Festival.

As a budding illustrator and cartoonist, Esteri hopes to show the world what it means to be Ugandan in contemporary times.

Personal life 
Esteri has been married since 2011 to Samuel Tebandeke, a Ugandan filmmaker. She currently lives in Kampala, Uganda.

Performances

Film

Theatre

References

External links 

 http://www.playbill.com/article/cooking-oil-a-new-play-set-in-developing-africa-gets-nyc-reading-may-28-prior-to-uganda-com-168784
 http://www.soulographie.org/the-plays/maria-kizito/
 http://www.bestofneworleans.com/blogofneworleans/archives/2014/11/19/review-maria-kizito
 https://web.archive.org/web/20160511201644/http://www.nofringe.org/
 https://web.archive.org/web/20160525055333/http://www.masa.ci/en/
 https://www.yahoo.com/music/queen-katwe-esther-tebandeke-working-224100032.html
 http://blueimp.site

1984 births
Living people
Ugandan artists
Ugandan cartoonists
Women cartoonists
21st-century Ugandan actresses
Ugandan film actresses
Ugandan stage actresses